Swamp Creek or Swamp Branch is a stream in Oregon County in the Ozarks of southern Missouri. It is a tributary of Frederick Creek.

Swamp Creek was so named on account of wetlands near its course.

See also
List of rivers of Missouri

References

Rivers of Oregon County, Missouri
Rivers of Missouri